Actinostella is a genus of sea anemones in the family Actiniidae.

Species
The World Register of Marine Species includes these species in the genus:-
Actinostella bradleyi (Verrill, 1869)
Actinostella californica (McMurrich, 1893)
Actinostella correae (Schlenz & Belém, 1992)
Actinostella digitata (McMurrich, 1893)
Actinostella excelsa (Wassilieff, 1908)
Actinostella flosculifera (Le Sueur, 1817)
Actinostella ornata (Verrill, 1869)
Actinostella radiata (Duchassaing de Fonbressin & Michelotti, 1860)
Actinostella striata (Wassilieff, 1908)
Actinostella variabilis (Hargitt, 1911)

References

Actiniidae
Hexacorallia genera